{{DISPLAYTITLE:C6H7KO6}}
The molecular formula C6H7KO6 (molar mass: 214.21 g/mol, exact mass: 213.9880 u) may refer to:

 Potassium ascorbate
 Potassium erythorbate